Emily Axford is an American actress, writer, and producer. She is best known for her various roles in CollegeHumor videos, her role as Emily on the truTV comedy Adam Ruins Everything, and for her role on the Pop original  Hot Date co-starring her husband Brian K. Murphy.

Early life and education
Axford grew up in the suburbs of Albany, New York. She earned a Bachelor of Arts degree in religion from George Washington University in 2007. At GWU, she was a part of the co-ed improv troupe called ReceSs. After college, Axford studied at the Upright Citizens Brigade in New York City and then Los Angeles, where she first ventured into internet sketch comedy.

Personal life
Axford is married to Brian K. Murphy, whom she met while working together at College Humor in the early 2010s. The couple has collaborated on several different projects, including the satirizations of their own relationship. They currently reside in Los Angeles, California.

Career
From 2011 to 2017, Axford was a writer and actress for digital comedy company CollegeHumor. In 2017, Axford and Murphy transitioned to working as executive producers and actors on the Pop show Hot Date, which had begun as a web series for CollegeHumor. From 2015 to 2019, Axford co-starred in both the College Humor and TruTV iterations of Adam Ruins Everything.

Axford and Murphy have, in conjunction with Caldwell Tanner, hosted 8-Bit Book Club, a podcast in which they read and discussed video game novels. 
Axford participates in a variety of Dungeons & Dragons Actual Play shows. She is a player, and occasional game-master, in the HeadGum podcast Not Another D&D Podcast with Murphy, Tanner, and Jake Hurwitz. Axford is also a main player character on Dimension 20, a series from CollegeHumor's streaming service Dropout. She has starred as a variety of characters between the two shows' several campaigns, most of which utilize Dungeons & Dragons 5th Edition. She is a featured member of Dimenson 20'''s post-game podcast, Adventuring Party.

Axford and Murphy co-wrote HEY, U UP? (For a Serious Relationship): How to Turn Your Booty Call into Your Emergency Contact'', a satirical relationship advice book that was published in 2018.

Filmography

Television

Web

Video games

References

External links

1980s births
Living people
21st-century American actresses
American television actresses
CollegeHumor people
Columbian College of Arts and Sciences alumni
People from Albany, New York